Hylton Jessop (12 February 1868 – 19 July 1924) was an English cricketer. He played three matches for Gloucestershire in 1896.

References

1868 births
1924 deaths
English cricketers
Gloucestershire cricketers
Sportspeople from Cheltenham